Robert Nainby (1869–1948) was an Irish actor.

Filmography

References

External links

1869 births
1948 deaths
Male actors from Dublin (city)
Irish male film actors
20th-century Irish male actors